Shen Qiang (born May 11, 1990 in Jixi, Heilongjiang, People's Republic of China) is a Canadian table tennis player of Chinese origin. As of August 2010, Shen is ranked no. 366 in the world by the International Table Tennis Federation (ITTF). He is also right-handed, and uses the shakehand grip.

Shen started his sporting career, when he became a member of the provincial table tennis team in Heilongjiang at the age of eleven. He set an early success by winning the 12-and-under division in the men's singles at the national table tennis championships, before he moved with his family to Ottawa, Ontario, Canada in 2004. Despite his lack of English, Shen obtained a citizenship, studied at Glebe Collegiate Institute, and worked as a resident athlete for the National Table Tennis Centre, under his personal and head coach Marles Martins. Shen made his international debut at the 2007 Pan American Games in Rio de Janeiro, where he earned a bronze medal, along with his fellow table tennis players Pradeeban Peter-Paul and Pierre-Luc Hinse, in the men's team event.

Shen qualified for the inaugural men's team event at the 2008 Summer Olympics in Beijing, by receiving a continental spot for the Americas from ITTF's Computer Team Ranking List. Shen and his teammates Pradeeban Peter-Paul and Wilson Zhang placed fourth in the preliminary pool round, against Germany, Croatia, and Singapore, receiving a total of three points and three straight losses.

References

External links
 
 Profile – Canadian Olympic Team
 NBC 2008 Olympics profile

1990 births
Living people
Canadian male table tennis players
Table tennis players at the 2008 Summer Olympics
Olympic table tennis players of Canada
Table tennis players at the 2007 Pan American Games
Pan American Games bronze medalists for Canada
Chinese emigrants to Canada
People from Jixi
Table tennis players from Heilongjiang
Sportspeople from Ottawa
Pan American Games medalists in table tennis
Naturalised table tennis players
Medalists at the 2007 Pan American Games